Rhysotritia is a genus of mites in the family Euphthiracaridae.

Species
 Rhysotritia bifurcata Niedbała, 1993
 Rhysotritia brasiliana Mahunka, 1983
 Rhysotritia comteae Mahunka, 1983
 Rhysotritia furcata Bayoumi & Mahunka, 1979
 Rhysotritia penicillata Mahunka, 1982

References

Acari genera
Acari of New Zealand
Sarcoptiformes